Héroes sin fama is a 1940 Argentine comedy-drama film directed by Mario Soffici.

Cast
Gloria Bayardo
Cayetano Biondo
María Esther Buschiazzo
Rufino Córdoba
Elisa Galvé
Adolfo Linvel
Ángel Magaña
Federico Mansilla
José Olarra
Joaquín Petrocino
Leticia Scury
Marino Seré
Félix Tortorelli

External links
 

1940 films
1940 comedy-drama films
1940s Spanish-language films
Argentine black-and-white films
Films directed by Mario Soffici
Argentine comedy-drama films
1940s Argentine films